General elections were held in Bangladesh on 15 February 1996. They were boycotted by most opposition parties, and saw voter turnout drop to just 21%. The result was a victory for the Bangladesh Nationalist Party (BNP), which won 278 of the 300 elected seats. This administration was short-lived, however, only lasting 12 days before the installation of caretaker government and fresh elections held in June.

Background
In March 1994, controversy over a parliamentary by-election, which the Bangladesh Awami League-led opposition claimed the BNP government had rigged, led to an indefinite boycott of Parliament by the entire opposition. The opposition also began a program of repeated general strikes to press its demand that Khaleda Zia's government resign and that a caretaker government supervise a general election. Efforts to mediate the dispute, under the auspices of the Commonwealth Secretariat, failed. After another attempt at a negotiated settlement failed narrowly in late December 1994, the opposition resigned en masse from Parliament. The opposition then continued a campaign of marches, demonstrations, and strikes in an effort to force the government to resign. The opposition, including the Awami League's Sheikh Hasina, Jatiya Party and Bangladesh Jamaat-e-Islami pledged to boycott national elections scheduled for 15 February 1996.

Results
Incumbent Prime Minister Khaleda Zia's BNP was re-elected for the second term after a landslide victory, but in voting boycotted and denounced as unfair by the three main opposition parties. The voter turnout was the lowest in Bangladesh's parliamentary electoral history at only 21%. Following the election, the President invited Zia to form a government, but this administration was short-lived, lasting only 12 days.

Aftermath
An immediate series of hartals (strikes) were called by the other parties and an indefinite non-cooperation movement was conducted until demands for a new, free election was met. In March 1996, following escalating political turmoil, the sitting Parliament enacted the thirteenth Constitutional amendment installing a neutral caretaker government to assume power and conduct new parliamentary elections; former Chief Justice Muhammad Habibur Rahman was named Chief Advisor (a position equivalent to prime minister) in the interim government. Zia's administration lasted only 12 days. New parliamentary elections were scheduled for June 1996.

References

General
1996 06
Bangladesh
General
1996